"So in Love" is a song by American R&B/soul artist Jill Scott, taken from her fourth studio album The Light of the Sun (2011). The song features Anthony Hamilton. It was released on April 26, 2011 as the first single from the album.

Track listing
Digital download
"So in Love" featuring Anthony Hamilton – 3:32

Chart performance
The song debuted at number 43 on the US Billboard Hot R&B/Hip Hop Songs chart, making it the highest debut of her career on that chart, and has since peaked at number 10. The song also charted in Japan, peaking at number 70.

It is tied with Maxwell's Fortunate for longest time spent at #1 on the Urban AC Charts.

Charts

Weekly charts

Year-end charts

References

2011 singles
Jill Scott (singer) songs
2011 songs
Songs written by Jill Scott (singer)
Warner Records singles